Robert Donaldson (27 August 1868 – 28 April 1947) was a Scottish footballer. He played as a forward.

Donaldson played for Airdrieonians and Blackburn Rovers before joining Newton Heath in 1892.  He scored 66 goals in 147 appearances for Newton Heath. The first of these goals, scored against Blackburn Rovers on 3 September 1892, was also the club's first ever league goal. However, Newton Heath lasted just two seasons before demotion to the Second Division, where they remained when Donaldson retired from playing football in 1897.

Career statistics

References

Scottish footballers
Airdrieonians F.C. (1878) players
Blackburn Rovers F.C. players
Manchester United F.C. players
Luton Town F.C. players
Glossop North End A.F.C. players
Ashford United F.C. players
1868 births
1947 deaths
Football Alliance players
Association football forwards
Footballers from Coatbridge
English Football League players